Olimkent is an urban-type settlement in Tashkent Region, Uzbekistan. It is part of Oqqoʻrgʻon District. The town population in 1989 was 6435 people.

References

Populated places in Tashkent Region
Urban-type settlements in Uzbekistan